The Sangola Nagar Palika is the governing body of the city of Sangola in Solapur district in the Maharashtra, India. Members from the state's leading various political parties hold elected offices in the corporation. 
Sangola Nagar Palika is located in Sangola.

Corporation Election 2016

Political Performance in Election 2016

List of winning candidates

References 

Municipal councils in Maharashtra